Francis Peters may refer to:

Francis Edward Peters (1927-2020), academic
F. H. Peters, college football coach

See also
Frank Peters (disambiguation)